
Gmina Łopuszno is a rural gmina (administrative district) in Kielce County, Świętokrzyskie Voivodeship, in south-central Poland.

The gmina contains part of the protected area called Przedbórz Landscape Park.

Villages
Gmina Łopuszno contains the villages and settlements of Antonielów, Czałczyn, Czartoszowy, Dobrzeszów, Eustachów, Ewelinów, Fanisławice, Fanisławiczki, Gnieździska, Grabownica, Huta Jabłonowa, Jasień, Jedle, Józefina, Krężołek, Lasocin, Łopuszno, Marianów, Nowek, Olszówka, Orczów, Piotrowiec, Podewsie, Przegrody, Ruda Zajączkowska, Rudniki, Sarbice Drugie, Sarbice Pierwsze, Snochowice and Wielebnów.

Neighbouring gminas
Gmina Łopuszno is bordered by the gminas of Krasocin, Małogoszcz, Mniów, Piekoszów, Radoszyce, Słupia and Strawczyn.

References
Polish official population figures 2006

Lopuszno
Kielce County